Youcef Saïbi (born August 22, 1982 in Algiers) is a football player who is currently playing as a forward for NA Hussein Dey in the Algerian Ligue Professionnelle 1.

Career

NA Hussein Dey
On August 12, 2011, Saïbi signed a two-year contract with newly promoted NA Hussein Dey. On September 10, 2011, he made his official debut for the club as a starter in a league match against ES Sétif, scoring two goals in a 3-2 loss.

Honours
 Won the Algerian League once with JS Kabylie in 2008

References

External links
 DZFoot Profile
 

1982 births
Algerian footballers
Living people
JS Kabylie players
Footballers from Algiers
CR Belouizdad players
Algerian expatriate footballers
Expatriate footballers in Saudi Arabia
USM El Harrach players
Algerian Ligue Professionnelle 1 players
Saudi Professional League players
Algeria A' international footballers
NA Hussein Dey players
Algerian expatriate sportspeople in Saudi Arabia
Al-Ahli Saudi FC players
WR Bentalha players
Association football forwards
21st-century Algerian people